Kazhdan, also written as Kajdan, Kazdan, Každan, is a Jewish name that is an acronym for the Aramaic phrase Kohanei SHluchei De-rachmana Ninhu, "priests are the messengers of the Merciful"; it can refer to:

 Alexander Kazhdan - historian, byzantinist
 David Kazhdan - mathematician.
 Jerry Kazdan - mathematician

See also
 
 
 Kasdan
 Kashtan

Jewish surnames